Drosera indica is an insectivorous plant, a sundew native to tropical countries throughout the world, from Asia to Africa, but absent from the neotropics. Together with Australian endemic species D. aquatica, D. aurantiaca, D. barrettorum, D. cucullata, D. finlaysoniana, D. fragrans, D. glabriscapa, D. hartmeyerorum, D. nana, D. serpens it makes up the section Arachnopus.

Description
Drosera indica is an unbranched, annual herbaceous plant, supported by a fibrous root system and reaching a height of 5–50 cm (2–20 in). Leaves are narrowly linear, up to 10 cm [4 in] long with 1–1.5 cm [0.4–0.6 in] pedicels. Young plants stand upright, while older ones form scrambling stems with only the newest growth exhibiting an upright habit. The plant can be yellow-green to maroon in color. Flower petals can be white, pink, orange, or purple. Its chromosome count is 2n=28.

References

External links

 Catalogue of Life entry

indica
Carnivorous plants of Africa
Carnivorous plants of Asia
Carnivorous plants of Australia
Caryophyllales of Australia
Eudicots of Western Australia
Flora of the Northern Territory
Flora of South Australia
Flora of Queensland
Flora of New South Wales
Flora of Victoria (Australia)
Plants described in 1753
Taxa named by Carl Linnaeus
Flora of Maharashtra